The 1939–40 Akron Firestone Non-Skids season was the Non-Skids' third year in the United States' National Basketball League (NBL), which was also the third year the league existed. Eight teams competed in the NBL, comprising four teams each in the Eastern and Western Divisions. The Non-Skids were one of two teams from Akron, Ohio in the league, the other being the Akron Goodyear Wingfoots.

The Non-Skids played their home games at Firestone Clubhouse. For the second season in a row, the Non-Skids finished the season with a league best record (19–9) and won the Eastern Division. They then went on to repeat as league champions, once again topping the Western Division's Oshkosh All-Stars, three games to two in a best-of-five series, for the second consecutive season.

Head coach Paul Sheeks repeated as the league's Coach of the Year Award. Players Soup Cable (First Team) and Jack Ozburn (Second Team) earned All-NBL honors for the second straight season as well.

Roster

Regular season

Season standings

Playoffs

Eastern Division Semifinals
(E1) Akron Firestone Non-Skids vs. (E2) Detroit Eagles: Akron wins series 2–1
Game 1 @ Akron: Akron 48, Detroit 35
Game 2 @ Detroit: Detroit 49, Akron 37
Game 3 @ Akron: Akron 46, Detroit 35

NBL Championship
(E1) Akron Firestone Non-Skids vs. (W1) Oshkosh All-Stars: Akron wins series 3–2
Game 1 @ Oshkosh: Oshkosh 47, Oshkosh 37
Game 2 @ Oshkosh: Oshkosh 60, Akron 46
Game 3 @ Akron: Akron 35, Oshkosh 32
Game 4 @ Akron: Akron 41, Oshkosh 40
Game 5 vs. Akron: Akron 61, Oshkosh 60 → game played in Kent, Ohio

Awards and honors
 NBL Coach of the Year – Paul Sheeks
 First Team All-NBL – Soup Cable
 Second Team All-NBL – Jack Ozburn

References

Akron Firestone Non-Skids seasons
Akron Firestone
National Basketball League (United States) championship seasons
Akron Firestone Non-Skids
Akron Firestone Non-Skids